Tomáš Oravec (born 3 July 1980) is a Slovak former football forward who last played for SC Marchtrenk in the Austrian Landesliga.

Oravec became the Corgoň Liga top-scorer in 2006–07 whilst at Artmedia Bratislava.

On 15 September 2010, Oravec scored the first ever Champions League goal for MŠK Žilina in their 1-4 home loss against Chelsea.

Oravec scored two goals on his Slovakia debut on 15 August 2001 in a friendly against Iran.

International goals

Scores and results list Slovakia's goal tally first.

References

External links

  
 
 
 Tomáš Oravec photos
 

1980 births
Living people
Sportspeople from Košice
Slovak footballers
Association football forwards
Slovakia international footballers
FC VSS Košice players
MFK Ružomberok players
Czech First League players
FK Viktoria Žižkov players
FC Admira Wacker Mödling players
Panionios F.C. players
Boavista F.C. players
FC Petržalka players
MŠK Žilina players
Beijing Renhe F.C. players
FC Astra Giurgiu players
Enosis Neon Paralimni FC players
Slovak Super Liga players
Primeira Liga players
Chinese Super League players
Austrian Football Bundesliga players
Liga I players
Cypriot First Division players
Slovak expatriate footballers
Slovak expatriate sportspeople in Portugal
Slovak expatriate sportspeople in Austria
Expatriate footballers in Portugal
Expatriate footballers in Austria
Expatriate footballers in Greece
Expatriate footballers in China
Expatriate footballers in Romania
Expatriate footballers in Cyprus
Footballers at the 2000 Summer Olympics
Olympic footballers of Slovakia
Slovakia youth international footballers
Slovakia under-21 international footballers